State Route 227 (SR 227) is a  connecting state highway that travels south-to-north through portions of Treutlen County in the east-central part of the U.S. state of Georgia.

Route description
SR 227 begins at an intersection with SR 46 east of Soperton. Here, the roadway continues as unsigned Treutlen County Road 141 (Sweet Onion Road). SR 46 heads northwest to the Treutlen County Airport and Soperton. It heads north, intersecting Treutlen CR 60 (Gillis Tennant Road). Then, it intersects Treutlen CR 45 (Joe Moxley Road, which heads northeast) and Corsey Grove Way (which heads southwest). A short distance to the north-northwest, it meets its northern terminus, an intersection with US 221/SR 56, northeast of Soperton.

SR 227 is not part of the National Highway System, a system of routes determined to be the most important for the nation's economy, mobility and defense.

History
SR 227 was established in 1950 along the same alignment as it runs today. It was paved along its whole length at this time, as well.

Major intersections

See also

References

External links

227
Transportation in Treutlen County, Georgia